Le Vésinet–Centre is a railway station in Le Vésinet, a suburb about 16 km west of central Paris. Le Vésinet–Centre station uses a basic RER station setup, two tracks and two side platforms.

Service
Le Vésinet–Centre is on the A1 branch of the RER A. Therefore, westbound services always terminate at Saint-Germain-en-Laye whilst eastbound ones travel to downtown Paris and Boissy-Saint-Léger on the A2 branch. Passengers must switch at Vincennes for trains to Marne-la-Vallée – Chessy on the A4 branch. In general, evening service arrives every 15 minutes, off-peak service arrives at 10-minute intervals, and at peak hours trains come every six minutes.

The station is in zone 4 of the RATP fare zone system. A ticket for any station outside of this zone increases based on the number of zones travelled. Thus, whilst a ticket to any station in zone 4 is only €1.50, a ticket to zone 1 (equivalent of central Paris) costs €3.60.

Connections
  Bus en Seine, 6A, 6B, 6C, 20

Réseau Express Régional stations
Railway stations in France opened in 1972
Railway stations in Yvelines